TTEC Holdings, Inc. (formerly named "TeleTech"), is an American customer experience technology and services company headquartered in Englewood, Colorado.

History

Founding and early developments (1982-1996) 
The company was founded in 1982 by Kenneth D. Tuchman under the name TeleTech Holdings, Inc. In 1986, the company moved to Sherman Oaks, California.

By 1995, it had added call centers in other states. In 1996 it completed its IPO.

International growth and recent development (since 1997) 
After the completion of its IPO global operations begin. In 1998, the company expands to Scotland, Canada, Argentina and Brazil. Three years later the expansion continues, centers were opened in the Philippines. In 2006, TeleTech acquired Direct Alliance.

In 2010, TeleTech acquired an 80 percent stake in the management consulting firm Peppers & Rogers Group. The same year, the company expands into the Middle East. Four years later, it grew its presence in Europe by starting operations in Sofia, Bulgaria.

Company

Management and leadership 
TTEC is managed by a leadership team of 14 members (2022). Kenneth D. Tuchman is the founder and current CEO of the company and also serves as chairman of the board. The board has a total of eight members (2022).

Acquisitions
In recent years TTEC grew its business through a variety of acquisitions, including:
 2022: Faneuil
 2021: Avtex
 2020: VoiceFoundry
 2017: Connextions
 2017: Motif India infotech
 2016: Atelka
 2014: rogenSi
 2014: Sofica
 2013: Technology Solutions Group, Inc.
 2012: Guidon Performance Solutions
 2012: iKnowtion
 2011: eLoyalty Corporation (integrated contact services business unit)

Products and services

Awards and recognition 

 2021: Forbes names TTEC one of the World's Top Female Friendly Companies

References

External links
 

American companies established in 1982
Business services companies established in 1982
Business process outsourcing companies of the United States
Call centre companies
Companies listed on the Nasdaq
1982 establishments in Colorado
1996 initial public offerings
Companies based in Englewood, Colorado